An annular solar eclipse occurred on June 28, 1889. A solar eclipse occurs when the Moon passes between Earth and the Sun, thereby totally or partly obscuring the image of the Sun for a viewer on Earth. An annular solar eclipse occurs when the Moon's apparent diameter is smaller than the Sun's, blocking most of the Sun's light and causing the Sun to look like an annulus (ring). An annular eclipse appears as a partial eclipse over a region of the Earth thousands of kilometres wide. The path of annularity crossed Atlantic Ocean, Africa and Indian Ocean. This was the 47th solar eclipse of Solar Saros 125. The Sun was 95% covered in a moderate annular eclipse, lasting 7 minutes and 22 seconds and covering a broad path up to 232 km wide.

Related eclipses 
It is a part of solar Saros 125.

The last seven annular solar eclipses of Solar Saros 125 without a penumbra southern limit (six after 1889)

Part 1 of 2

Part 2 of 2

Saros 125

Notes

References
 NASA chart graphics
 Googlemap

1889 6 28
1889 in science
1889 06 28
June 1889 events